Batavia Downs is a harness racing track  and casino in Batavia, New York. It is located in Genesee County between Buffalo and Rochester just off of the New York State Thruway (Interstate 90). It opened on September 20, 1940, and is the oldest lighted harness racetrack in the United States.

History
In 1939, William "Lefty" Goldberg and others chose Batavia, halfway between Buffalo and Rochester, for par-mutuel wagering on horse races.  Harold Wishman, William Zimmer, Arthur Martin and Frederick Strohm were stockholders in the Monroe-Genesee Breeders Association, a predecessor to the Genesee-Monroe Racing Association, which rented the Genesee County Fairgrounds for racing.

1940s
In 1940, Batavia Downs opened pari-mutuel racing at 8:20 PM on September 20, 1940.  Crowds of more than 2,500 attended and $10,411 was wagered on the first card.

In 1941, Batavia Downs opened to an estimated crowd of about 4,000 and a handle of $20,231.  Track lighting was improved.

The season was cancelled in 1942 and 1943 because of war travel restrictions. 
   
In 1944, Pat E. Provenzano borrowed money and bought out stockholder William Weisman, a New York City attorney, for $15,000. Provenzano was elected president of the Genesee Monroe Racing Association. 
   
In 1947, Provenzano purchased the racetrack property for $150,000 after the Genesee County Agricultural Society's fair association went bankrupt. Proximity set the then-track record of 2:04. In 1948 she broke her own time record with a time of 1:59 3/5.

1950s
In 1959, Bye Bye Byrd beat Tar Boy and equaled the world record for a half-mile track, 159.2.  Attendance for this race was 9,633.

1960s
In 1962, a fire devastated the stables, killing a caretaker, 26 horses, and causing an estimated $625,000 in damages, not including lost revenues. The Downs underwent extensive renovations to prevent fires.
   
In 1963, Batavia Downs welcomed its eight millionth visitor.
 
In 1964, the grandstand was enclosed in glass.

In 1966, Bret Hanover down under Cardigan Bay set a track record of 1:58.1.  Batavia Downs enjoyed its biggest crowd at the time, as 15,228 came to watch and wagered $515,334.

In 1968, Downs General Manager Herm Grannis was elected president of Harness Tracks of America, where he established the Harness Tracks Security.

1970s
In 1970, Batavia Downs was honored by the Genesee County Chamber of Commerce for spreading the name and fame of Batavia all over the United States.

In 1972, New York State legislation created off-track betting to bail New York City out of near bankruptcy.

In 1973, the Western Regional Off-Track Betting Corporation was formed.

Batavia Downs and Buffalo Raceway changed operations in 1975 to a single season from the split-season racing. 
 
Pat Provenzano, longtime president of the Downs, and John O. Marra, Executive Vice-President, were indicted for alleged tax evasion charges in 1976. Provenzano pleads no contest and was fined $10,000. Provenzano died the next year on September 9 at age 76.
   
In 1977, Double-Gaited Excalibur, owned by Batavia driver, Fred Haslip and driven by Elba farmer Paul Zambito Jr. set a world record.  He both trotted and paced a time of 2:03 3/5 miles for a total of 4:07 1/5, breaking a world record set in 1939.

1980s
In 1980, Niatross set a track record of 1:55 before a crowd of 9,915.  Later that year, Niatross set an all-age world record for pacers on a half-mile track. That year, he lost only two of his 26 starts. 
      
Barbara H. Provenzano, Pat's widow, bought out other non-family stockholders in 1981.  She served as chairwoman of the board until her death in 1990.  The Pat E. Provenzano Memorial Trot was inaugurated in 1984.
 
The Genesee County Chamber of Commerce honored Batavia Downs in 1987 for making a major impact on the region's economy. 
   
In 1988, Ambro Flori won the only Breeders' Crown ever held at Batavia Downs.  The purse was $286,756 (largest purse at Batavia Downs).

1990s
In 1993, Earl won the Provenzano Trot and broke the all-aged trotting record in 1:56. Later that year, Getting Personal won the New York Sire Stake event and broke the track record 1:53.3.
   
In 1994, Batavia Downs became the first track in New York history to have its license revoked by racing authorities. This was due to a contract dispute with horseman.
   
In 1997, the track held a shorter meet, only 28 days.  Live racing ended. 
   
In 1998, Western OTB bought the track for $2.48 million.  The next year, Western OTB and Buffalo Raceway officials agreed that the Erie County track would support Western's bid to obtain a racing license, in exchange for Western paying an annual sum for five years.

2000s
In 2000, opposition from other racetracks in the state and a leadership battle in the State Assembly prevented legislation from being passed to allow Off-Track Betting Corporation (OTB) to run a track.

In 2001, simulcasting opened under direction of OTB. That same year, a bill passed allowing Western OTB to apply for a harness racing license. 
   
Batavia Downs reopened on July 29, 2002 under the direction of Western OTB with over $10 million in renovations.  It welcomed over 6,000 in attendance.  Later that year the first ever Robert J. Kane Memorial pace was held and won by Mattarocket.

Batavia Downs hired the youngest Racing Secretary in the country when they hired local Elba man Joe Zambito who was only 29 years old at the time. Mr.Zambito was also hired as the assistant announcer to former Meadowlands announcer/weatherman John Bothe. Mr. Bothe continued to be the announcer until the 2007 season when Mr.Zambito took over.

In August 2007, the first-ever visit of the Mildred Williams Lady Driving Series at Batavia Downs was held, with more than $10,000 being raised for breast cancer research.

The largest attendance at the track in the 2007 season was for a memorial race, which commemorated the great Albatross’s visit to the track.  The race was remembered as the “Dream Pace”, in 1972 and was a showdown of the world’s greatest pacers at Batavia Downs.

S J’s Morgan win 11 races at the meet and is named 2008 Horse of the Year.

After 2008's meet, Ron Beback Jr. takes home first ever Downs trainer and driver title.

In 2008, Jeff Gregory wins $10,000 All-Star Drivers Challenge Fundraiser, which raised over $15,000 raised for the Breast Cancer Coalition of Rochester.

2009

Russell Hill sets new track record for 3 year-old colt and gelding trotters winning in 1:57.4.
	
OK Braveheart establishes new track record for 3 year-old pacing colts and geldings winning in 1:52.2, the fastest mile of the season.

Favorite Foiled Again cruises in 1:52.3 taking the tracks biggest local event, the $40,000 Robert J. Kane Memorial Pace.

Kevin Cummings wins first ever Batavia Downs Casino drivers title.
Sherri Holliday wins her first training title at the Downs.

6-year-old pacer Arm and a Leg is named 2009 Horse of the Year at Batavia Downs Casino.
	
Over $15,000 is raised for Mercy Flight of WNY through first ever Batavia Downs Casino golf tournament, sponsorship of races, silent auction.

2010 Racing Season Highlights include:

Reinsman Jeff Gregory, John Schroeder and Clint Galbraith become the inaugural members of the Upstate Harness Writers, Batavia Downs Hall of Fame.

Yonkers invader Sailing Cruise at odds of 27-1 pulls off the major upset in the 8th edition of the Robert J. Kane Memorial Pace.

Kevin Cummings and Sherri Holiday successfully defend their titles as top driver and trainer.

Two Twentytwo and Fifty Two Finn are named the Pacer and Trotter of the season.

Kaley Falkowski of Batavia High wins the first ever College Scholarship race that featured five area high school students competing for $7,500 in scholarship money.

2013

Foiled Again, the richest harness horse in the History of Harness Racing returned to the Batavia oval to win the Robert J. Kane Memorial Pace in front of a packed house.

Casino
In 2001, the New York State Legislature passed a bill to allow New York State racetracks to have video lottery terminals (VLTs) inside the racetracks, making them “racinos”.

Batavia’s video lottery era began on May 18, 2005 with the opening of Batavia Downs Gaming. Over 5,000 people attended opening night. The casino has over 600 machines made by Bally, IGT and Spielo.

Restaurants
Four restaurants are located on the premises.

The Clubhouse is open on race nights during the live harness racing season July–December and features tiered style seating for view of the racetrack.  A buffet-style and sit down menus are offered as is wagering via intertrack wagering windows.  The clubhouse also features a bar.

Homestretch Grill is a fast-casual restaurant is open late and offers breakfast, lunch, and dinner. Patrons must be 18 or older to enter.

The 34 Rush Sports Bar, located on the gaming floor, is named after Buffalo Football’s Hall-of-Fame running back Thurman Thomas & offers food and drink menus for both lunch and dinner daily. Must be 18 or older to enter the sports bar.

Fortune's Restaurant is located at the south end of the facility and offers a fine-dining atmosphere with a variety of food and drinks with a largely Italian and American menu. All ages are now welcome to dine at the restaurant.

References

External links
 REF 1 All Batavia Downs history/information courtesy of Batavia Downs Website
 REF 6 Rochester Democrat and Chronicle Article on WNY Gaming(2007)

1940 establishments in New York (state)
Sports venues in Genesee County, New York
Horse racing venues in New York (state)
Sports venues in New York (state)
Sports venues completed in 1940